John Cobbold may refer to:

John Cobbold (1746–1835), brewer, banker, merchant
John Cobbold (1774–1860), brewer, banker, merchant, son of the above
John Cobbold (1797–1882), brewer and MP for Ipswich, son of the above
John Cobbold (1831–1875), MP for Ipswich, son of the above
John Cobbold (businessman) (1927–1983), English businessman, chairman of Ipswich Town F.C., 1957–1976

See also
 Cobbold family tree, showing the relationship between the above